The Sehlabathebe National Park is located in the Maloti Mountains in Qacha's Nek District, Lesotho and is part of the Maloti-Drakensberg World Heritage Site. The park was first established on May 8. 1969 and since then, it is recognized important in terms of biological diversity and cultural heritage.  The landscape is dominated by a grassland of various types. The larger ecosystem functions provide freshwater to Lesotho, South Africa, and Namibia.

Location 
Sehlabathebe National Park is situated in the south-east corner of Lesotho at an average elevation of some 2,400 metres above sea level.

Environment
Most of the park is taken up by a designated wilderness area, and is uninhabited. Much of it consists of cliffs, waterfalls, pools, rock dwellings and rock art. It is known for its scenery with unique rock formations. The Tsoelikanyane waterfall is the biggest waterfall in the park. A total of 65 rock art sites have been identified in the area, as well as other forms of the previous habitation of the site. 

The park contains habitats supporting a range of Afro-Alpine and Sub-Alpine plants, mammals, birds, reptiles, amphibians and fish. The site hosts 23 percent of the plant species in the whole Maluti Drakensberg area. Some of the park's species are endangered, including three vertebrates: the Maluti redfin, a critically endangered fish which is endemic to the park, the Cape vulture and the bearded vulture. The Sehlabathebe water lily is an endangered aquatic plant.

Recognition 
This site was added to the UNESCO World Heritage Tentative List on October 8, 2008, in the Mixed (Cultural + Natural) category. Sehlabathebe is currently run under the Ministry of Tourism, Environment, and Culture jurisdiction. The park has also been recognised as an Important Bird Area (IBA) by BirdLife International.

Notes

References 
Sehlabathebe National Park - UNESCO World Heritage Centre Retrieved 2009-03-02.
Ramutsindela, M. (2007), Transfrontier Conservation in Africa: At the Confluence of Capital, Politics, and Nature, CABI.

External links 
 http://www.lonelyplanet.com/lesotho/eastern-lesotho/sehlabathebe-national-park#ixzz2pPZKta7y

National parks of Lesotho
Important Bird Areas of Lesotho
Protected areas established in 1969
Qacha's Nek District